Anthropological Linguistics may refer to:

 Anthropological linguistics, the subfield of linguistics and anthropology
 Anthropological Linguistics (journal)